Raymond Russell (born 26 July 1972) is a Scottish professional golfer.

Russell turned professional in 1993 and won a European Tour card at the 1995 qualifying school. His only European Tour win came in his 1996 rookie season at the Air France Cannes Open. 1996 and 1997 were his two best seasons, with 14th and 16th place seasons on the Order of Merit. He did not build on this early success, but stayed in the top 100 of the Order of Merit every season until 2004. In 2005 he finished 119 and lost full membership of the tour. His best finish in a major championship is tied fourth at the 1998 Open Championship at Royal Birkdale.

Russell represented Great Britain & Ireland in the 1993 Walker Cup and Scotland in the Alfred Dunhill Cup (1996 and 1997) and the 1997 World Cup.

Amateur wins
1988 Scottish Boys Under-16 Championship
1992 Scottish Youths Championship

Professional wins (3)

European Tour wins (1)

Challenge Tour wins (1)

Alps Tour wins (1)

Results in major championships

Note: Russell only played in the U.S. Open and The Open Championship.

CUT = missed the half-way cut
"T" indicates a tie for a place

Team appearances
Amateur
Jacques Léglise Trophy (representing Great Britain & Ireland): 1989 (winners)
European Amateur Team Championship (representing Scotland): 1993
Walker Cup (representing Great Britain & Ireland): 1993
European Amateur Team Championship (representing Scotland): 1993

Professional
Dunhill Cup (representing Scotland): 1996, 1997
World Cup (representing Scotland): 1997

See also
2010 Challenge Tour graduates

References

External links

Scottish male golfers
European Tour golfers
Golfers from Edinburgh
1972 births
Living people